Deepfrozen is a 2006 film written and directed by Luxembourgish director Andy Bausch and starring Peter Lohmeyer and Lale Yavaş. Filmed in Luxembourg, the film was premiered at Luxembourg on 7 September 2006, and was featured at the Oldenburg International Film Festival in Germany on 14 September 2007.

Cast
Peter Lohmeyer as Ronnie
Lale Yavas as Zoya
Thierry van Werveke as Lars
Marco Lorenzini as Speck
Ingrid Caven as Vicki

References

External links
 
Cinefacts (German)
Zelluloid.de (German)
Die Furche (German)

2006 films
Luxembourgian comedy films
2000s German-language films
2006 comedy films
Films shot in Luxembourg